Scotland is an unincorporated community in Jasper County, Missouri, United States. It is located slightly northwest of the junction of  Missouri Route 66 and Interstate 44/US 71.

A post office called Scotland was established in 1873, and remained in operation until 1908. The community derives its name from Benjamin Scott, a local minister.

References

Unincorporated communities in Jasper County, Missouri
Unincorporated communities in Missouri